Tales from Earthsea is a collection of fantasy stories and essays by American author Ursula K. Le Guin, published by Harcourt in 2001. It accompanies five novels (1968 to 2001) set in the fictional archipelago Earthsea.

Tales from Earthsea won the annual Endeavour Award, for the best book by a writer from the Pacific Northwest, and Locus Award, Best Collection, for speculative fiction collections.
Two of the five collected stories were previously published, "Darkrose and Diamond" (1999) and "Dragonfly" (1998), and both had been nominated for annual awards.

Contents

 Foreword
 "The Finder". The school of magic is established on Roke island.
 "Darkrose and Diamond" (1999). The daughter of a witch and the son of a rich merchant love each other.
 "The Bones of the Earth". Ogion the Silent helps his wizard master deal with an earthquake.
 "On the High Marsh". A mysterious healer arrives in a remote village threatened by a livestock epidemic.
 "Dragonfly" (1998). This is a postscript to the novel Tehanu.
 "A Description of Earthsea" (reference material)

"Darkrose and Diamond" was first published in The Magazine of Fantasy and Science Fiction, October 1999. "Dragonfly" was first published in Legends, October 1998.

Themes

All of the stories reinterpret the world of Earthsea. In the original trilogy, Earthsea society in general and the practice of magic in particular are dominated by men. Women can only be witches, which is the despised lowest rank of the magical world, as expressed in the proverb "Weak as women's magic, wicked as women's magic".

The Tales from Earthsea stories try to redress the balance. It is disclosed that the Roke school had been established by women who were later excluded from it; and that Ogion, Ged's beloved tutor and mentor, had learned his magic from a master who had learned from an "unauthorised" woman mage. Other stories feature strong and assertive women who in various ways challenge male dominance.

References

Sources

External links
 

Short story collections by Ursula K. Le Guin
Fantasy short story collections
2001 short story collections
Earthsea books
Endeavour Award-winning works
Harcourt (publisher) books
Children's short story collections
2001 children's books